Tom Vermelid Kristoffersen (born 15 October 1976) is a retired Norwegian football defender.

He came through Eidsvold Turn and played Eliteserien football for Lillestrøm, Sandefjord and Hamarkameratene.

References

1976 births
Living people
People from Eidsvoll
Norwegian footballers
Eidsvold TF players
Lillestrøm SK players
Sandefjord Fotball players
Hamarkameratene players
Strømmen IF players
Ullensaker/Kisa IL players
Lyn Fotball players
Eliteserien players
Norwegian First Division players
Association football defenders
Sportspeople from Viken (county)